Cao Yang (born 15 December 1981 in Tianjin) is a Chinese international football player who currently plays as a versatile defender or midfielder.

Club career
Cao Yang began his career graduating through the Tianjin Teda youth system eventually joining the senior team when he made his league debut on September 17, 2000 against Yunnan Hongta F.C. in a 2–1 defeat. The following season, he would further progress within the Tianjin Teda team by playing in ten league games for them. A versatile defender with good offensive and defensive ability who could also play in midfield as well as being  physically tall, saw Cao firmly establish himself within as a permanent fixture within the Tianjin team by the end of the 2002 league season.

A regular for the club for several seasons he was named as the reserve captain behind Wang Xiao. In the 2008 Chinese Super League season Tianjin Teda where to have one of their most productive seasons when they finished the league fourth and were allowed the chance to play in the AFC Champions League. During their debut appearance in the AFC Champions League Cao Yang had the honor to be named as their captain against Kawasaki Frontale.

International career
Cao Yang began his international career playing for the Chinese U-23 team where he was named in the squad to play in the Football at the 2002 Asian Games and saw China knocked out in the Quarter-finals. His performance in the tournament was considered good enough for him to be promoted to the senior team by the Chinese caretaker coach Shen Xiangfu on December 7, 2002 in a friendly game against Syria in a 3–1 victory. With Zhu Guanghu as the national teams coach Cao's international career would start to see him become a regular within the team and he was included in the squad that won the 2005 East Asian Football Championship as well as also being in the squad that took part in the 2007 AFC Asian Cup.

Career statistics

Honours

Club
Tianjin Teda FC
Chinese FA Cup: 2011

Country
East Asian Football Championship: 2005

References

External links
Player Profile at Sina.com

 

1981 births
Living people
Association football fullbacks
Chinese footballers
China international footballers
Footballers from Tianjin
Hui sportspeople
Tianjin Jinmen Tiger F.C. players
2007 AFC Asian Cup players
Chinese Super League players
Footballers at the 2002 Asian Games
Asian Games competitors for China